Dahanu (Pronunciation: [ɖəɦaːɳuː]) is a coastal town and a municipal council in Palghar district of Maharashtra state in Konkan division. It is located 110 km from Mumbai city and hosts Adani Power’s thermal power station. It is the site of the currently stalled Wadhawan port project at Rewas.

Location
Dahanu is located 65 km north of Virar on the Western Railway line of Mumbai Suburban Railway. It can be reached from National Highway NH-8, 24 km off from Charoti Naka. It is 22 km North of Boisar on the Western Railway line.  Nearby Sai temple is located in Narpad. Also famous for Mahalaxmi Temple located just 4 km from Charoti.

The Town
The name "Dahanu Gaon" originates from the word "Dhenu Gram" meaning the village of cows. A lot of cattle, particularly cows were owned by the people in Dahanu. Today, Dahanu has become a major commercial and industrial town in the Palghar district. It is well known for rose gardens, coconut groves and the chickoo fruit and are  35% of Maharashtra's chickoo production. Rubber balloons, rice mills and manufactured goods, are major manufacturing products which are produced in Dahanu. There is also a 2x250MW power plant that supplies electricity to Mumbai. The electricity is distributed by adani electricity.

Dahanu, a peaceful seaside town with a sprawling, uncluttered beach. The Dahanu-Bordi stretch is 17 km.  Irani settlers were first to cultivate chickoo in Dahanu. Dahanu is lined with fruit orchards and is favored for its chickoo fruit. Lycees is also grown and exported from Gholwad. Accessible from Dahanu is Udwada—a significant place of worship for the Zoroastrians—with a large, nifty temple that houses their sacred fire. This fire has been kept alive for almost a thousand years.

Earlier, Dahanu was also famous for Tadi (palm tree juice) business which was controlled by Shinwarbhai Jogibhai Kadu, his brother Bangyabhai Jogibhai Kadu and their family. They were one of the richest families in the town,  along with other Iranians.

Dahanu is governed by Dahanu Municipal Council which is responsible for all the civic infrastructure and administration of the town, Mr. Bharat Rajput is the current  president of the Dahanu Municipal council.

History
Dahanu is a medieval town with a long history. It was settled probably as early as 500 AD. Some records show possible settlement as early as 150 BC. The reasons for nomadic lifestyle of locals are unknown. All these developments were before 100 AD and are in reference to the area around Dahanu, rather than the Dahanu village itself.
 
Under the administration of the Sultanate of Gujarat, the coastal settlement grew in importance and soon attracted many other communities such as the local Konkanis as well as the surrounding tribal and Gujarati people. Later the Zoroastrians arrived too. It was frequented by Arab merchants during this time.

By the 1510s, the Portuguese established their influence in the Konkan region. The village was under de jure control of Portuguese from circa 1515 to 1661. The Inquisition as well as the Portuguese-Vijayanagara alliance fueled this change of power. In 1570, Portuguese built a chapel as the region had several converts to Christianity. They also built a fortress to defend the surrounding area. The Chapel still stands today and goes by the name of Nossa Senhora Das Angustias. During the Portuguese era the village went by the name of Dolours.

In the 1700s, Dahanu was invaded and captured by the Marathas and remained under their control until the fall of Maratha Empire.

According to the Treaty of Mandsaur (1818), the Holkar state (which included the village of Dahanu) became subsidiary to the British. An unnamed officer was assassinated in the town by villagers over some dispute in the 1870s. Its details are unknown. The town became a part of  Independent India after its Struggle for Independence.

After the Sanyukta Maharashtra  Movement the Dahanu Taluka along with Talasari Taluka and Mumbai city became a part of Maharashtra state on 1 May 1960.

Education in Dahanu

Colleges and institutes
There are the following colleges and institutes in Dahanu:-
St Mary's High School in Masoli
S.R.K College in Masoli (Vadkun)
HMP High School in Masoli 
Ponda College near Dahanu beach
P G Junior College, Bordi.
Rustomjee Academy for Global Careers, Savta (Dahanu East)
Abhyankar Institute, Dahanu (Commerce Educational Institute Recognized by Govt.)
Jamshed & Shirin Guzder College of Visual Art, Savta (Dahanu East)
Gokhale Education Society's N.B.Mehta (V) Science College, Bordi

English medium schools
There are also English middle schools including
K.L.PONDA HIGH SCHOOL,FIRST HIGHSCHOOL IN DAHANU HAVING MARTHI AND SEMI ENGLISH MEDIUM WITH BIG PLAY GROUND.
St. Mary's High School, the first English medium school in Dahanu
Shirin Dinyar Irani Learners Academy
Shri. Hasumati Mohanlal Parekh High School, Dahanu
Tamarind Tree School, Dahanu, An advance school for tribal children
 Credo World School
 Divine Mercy school

Other  schools
1. Pujya Acharya Bhise Vidyalaya Kasa
2. Balakanji Bari High School Bapugaon
3. Surya nagar High school Waghadi
4. K.L. Ponda High School, Parnaka, Dahanu
5. H & H J Vakil Model High School.
6. S P H Highschool, Bordi
7. A.J.Mahatre high School, Narpad
8. H.M.P.High School, Masoli.
9. Vakil Model High School, Masloi
10.K.K.Mistry High School, Savta
11.Seva Vidya Mandir Adivasi High School & Jr. College Arts Gangangaon Dahanu
12. Gokhale Education Society's N.B.Mehta Mehta (V) Science College.

Agriculture
Dahanu is well known for its famous chikoos, capsicum and coconuts and tadi drink, a juice of palm tree. It is also known for its loving nature environment which has now become a huge tourist places near Mumbai.

Industries
The BSES (Bombay Suburban Electricity Supply) Power Plant was renamed as Reliance Energy Power Plant in the year 2005. In year 2018, Reliance sold its power generation and transmission business to Adani Electricity. Dahanu is a coastal region, the staple food of the people living there is rice and fish. Dahanu Road railway station is the last main station within boundary of Maharashtra state en route Mumbai Vadodara Western Railway line. Many express trains halt at this station. Weather here is very pleasant in the winters. Dahanu is also famous for the tribal people especially Warli tribe and other tribes. Dahanu and surrounding area is designated by the government of India as an ecologically fragile zone, to protect the greenery from industrial pollution. Dahanu Road also has many balloon factories in the Masoli area. Industrial development received a setback from new ecological regulations hence tourism, animal husbandry, fishing, small scale units and farming are the only industries where expansion can take place.
Dahanu has very known and popular computer and information technology coaching classes named Infolink computer education which is running by Mr. Ganesh Nair.

Dahanu Thermal Power Station

Dahanu Thermal Power Station (DTPS) is Adani electricity's power generating facility. It is a 500 MW (2 X 250 MW) coal-based thermal power station.

The power plant was commissioned in 1995. DTPS is the first power utility to get both ISO 9000 and ISO 14001 certificate in India.

Electrostatic precipitators (ESP) are installed to collect fly ash and minimize emissions to the atmosphere.

DTPS has installed a 275.34 m stack to ensure better dispersion of particulate matter. The stack has a diameter of 31.5 m at the bottom and a diameter of 16 m at the top, with two separate flues of 5.25 m diameter at the bottom and 4.75 m diameter at the top for each unit. This is the highest stack in Asia

Any expansion of the DTPS, is specifically not allowed as per:
1. Clearance conditions, 7 July 1988 by the Environment Dept. Government of Maharashtra and later on 29 March 1989 by Central Government MOEF
2. The Dahanu Notification dated 20 June 1991
3. The Supreme Court Order of 1996 which upheld the Dahanu Notification and issued further directives to ensure implementation of the same.

Nearby Industrial Area and other power stations
Tarapur Industrial Estate and Tarapur Atomic Power Station  are located close by. The huge industrial area at Tarapur accommodates various specialty chemical, bulk drugs, steel and alloy and textile manufacturing companies.

Temples

Some of the area's temples :

Mahalakshmi Temple, Mata Mahalaxmi & Mahalaxmi Gadh, Santoshi Temple-Ashagadh, Sai Baba Temple - Narpad, Shri Kevda Devi Mandir - Agar Road, Jagrut Hanuman Mandir - Agar & Waghadi, Mata Saptashrungi Mandir Nikane, Shri Gajanan Maharaj Mandir - Parnaka, Shree Ram mandir - Ramwadi, Dahanu Road (East), Shri Jalaram Mandir Dahanu Road 3 May 1995.

Shri 1008 Chandraprabhu Jain Temples (Dherasar)

The old Jain temple in Dahanu Gaon (Fort Area) is around 105 years old and is now included in Jain Tirth (Teerths). It is a Chandraprabhu Swami's temple and also has idols of Dadaguru Dev. A new Jain temple(Dherasar) is being built on Irani road in Masoli.

Laxmi Narayan Temple (Masoli)

Laxmi Narayan Temple is in Masoli Gaon near Dahanu Station road. It belongs to Pathak Family. It is open to all. The temple is very old in June 1949 temple built by Late Shri Shrinivas Babaji Pathak & Late shri Manohar Babaji Pathak.

Vishveshwar Temple

Vishveshwar Temple is in Dahanu Gaon and a Ganesh Temple near Dahanu Fort
The newly constructed temple at Kosbad Hill is an attraction for people from Mumbai and Surat as there are many visitors on Sundays. Tour organisers arrange a single day picnic from Mumbai and they come in numbers every weekends. In fact another new Jain Temple has been built (about 5 years ago) located at Irani Road opposite IDBI Bank. The Jain Temple at Kosbad was probably built about 10 to 15 years ago. (Information dated 7/4/13.)

Laxmi Narayan Temple - Beutiful temple

Laxmi Narayan Temple is in Dahanu Gaon. This temple is from Peshwa Era. It belongs to the Karandikar family. It is open to all. The temple has wooden carved Pillars on which the "Sabha Mandap" stands.

Geography
It has an average elevation of 9.89 metres. To the west of the town is the coast of the Arabian sea while the east is lined with the Sahyadri ranges. This combination has made Dahanu a tourist destination. Sprawling Chickoo wadis (farms), rose gardens, salt pans are among the other things that dot the landscape.

The Dahanu beach is an extensive 15 km stretch lined by coconut and Saru (casuarina equisetifolia) trees. This is mostly crowded on the weekend when people from the metropolitan city of Mumbai come to visit as it is a short commute. The other days life is very laid back and the beach does not see much tourist crowd except inhabitants of Dahanu. There are horse and weekend fairs on the beach.

Climate

Residential
Dahanu is a good residential location. Very good schools and colleges are located here.
Among them Shirin Dinyar Irani Learners Academy is well Known for Sport and innovative activities.St Mary's High school is the popular school with about 4000 students studying from nursery to class X .

Transportation 
State transport buses (Maharashtra State Transport Corporation) and Auto rickshaws are the general mode of transport in and around the town. The National Highway NH8 runs through the taluka near Charoti, around 25 km east of the Dahanu town. Dahanu has its own railway station, Dahanu Road. It lies on the Western line of the Mumbai Suburban Railway network. It is the northern limit (terminal station) of the Suburban local train network, although the track continues north to Gholvad and beyond.Regular local trains &  Memu are available for Churchgate, Dadar, Borivali & Virar, & also Panvel. There are also direct express trains from Dahanu which connects it with cities like Mumbai, Surat, Pune, Ahmedabad, Goa, Trivandrum, Bhuj, Jaipur, Jodhpur, Jamnagar, Delhi, Amritsar, Firozpur, Porbunder.

State-run Jawaharlal Nehru Port Trust (JNPT), India's busiest container gateway near Mumbai, is planning to build a satellite port at Vadhavan in Palghar district, Dahanu  in Maharashtra for at least Rs.10,000 crore.

Demographics
 India census, Dahanu has a population of 50,287. Males constitute 52% of the population and females 48%. Dahanu has an average literacy rate of 71%: male literacy is 77% and, female literacy is 64%. In Dahanu, 13% of the population is under 6 years of age.

Among minority languages, Gujarati is spoken by 34.43% of the population and Hindi by 19.80%.

Population of Dahanu Taluka

Adivasis(Warlis, Dubla,Dhodi),   Bhandari, Machhi, Agri(Mangela) and Bari community people dominate the population of the town with significant amount of Parsis and Iranis;Jains,Muslims and Gujaratis. This makes Dahanu a rich town by itself compared to neighbouring taluka of Palghar. In spite of a tradition of resistance, the indigenous Warlis have today become poor marginal farmers or migrant labourers barely surviving  from year to year. While their narratives and consciousness come from a history of police brutality, exploitation by landlords, moneylenders  and liquor contractors and from their continuous struggle for land rights and access to the forests, they are today forced into practicing settled subsistence agriculture. Moreover, categorized as backward and primitive, their culture, heritage and ecological understanding has come under attack. They now live on the margins of industrial and urban areas on the fringes of their slowly eroding forest lands.

Art and culture
There are mostly Warli/Varli, Malhar Koli, Mangela, Machhi, Bari,Mahyavanshi, Vdaval, Kunabi, Kokani, Kathodi and other tribes lives in Dahanu. The people in Dahanu taluka are mostly tribals, mostly inhabiting rural areas and having daily commute to urban areas for work. Tribal culture is dominant in the talk and customs. The tribal art most predominantly shows village life and the day-to-day functions. The original people of this land are tribals. World-famous tribal art "Warli art" originated here from Warli tribe. Many foreign students have resided in the tribal settlements for learning Warli art. Similarly Tarpa dance (Adivasi Nrutya) and Dhole dance are famous all over the world.

Festivals
 Jagtik Adivasi Din
 Koli Bhaji
 Nag Panchami
 Gauri Ganapati
 Sakar Chuvat
 Nava Bhat Khane
 Sarvapitari Avas or Omasya
 Dival Baras or Bagh Baras
 Dasara
 Divali, Berya
 Saticha Deva
 Sakrat
 Holi or Simga
 Mahi Bij
 Gudi Padwa
 Akhati
 Boida
 Khalyacha Deva
 Shri Ram navami
 Gauri
 Eid
 Eid E Milad 
 Mohram 
 Paryushana [Jain festival]
 Shree Krishna Janmashtami [ Gopalkala ]
 Ganesh Utsav
 Navratri Utsav
 Guru Govind Jayanti
 Guru Nanak Jayanti

See also
 2020 Palghar mob lynching

References

Further reading

External links
 Dahanu Municipal Council online

Cities and towns in Palghar district
Talukas in Maharashtra